Keith Raymond Stackpole Jr. (born 10 July 1940) is a former Victorian and Australian cricketer who played in 43 Test matches and six One Day Internationals between 1966 and 1974. He went on to become a cricket commentator on radio and TV in the 80s and 90s. His father, Keith Stackpole Sr. also played first-class cricket and was a noted Australian rules footballer for Collingwood and Fitzroy.

Stackpole was a big, heavy batsman in the Colin Milburn mould and quite capable of hitting the ball all over the ground. He made his Test debut against England in the Fourth Test in Adelaide in 1965–66, where he took a great catch to dismiss Jim Parks, made 43 batting at number 8 and took the wickets of the England captain M.J.K. Smith and his vice-captain Colin Cowdrey with his leg spin, his 2/33 remaining his best Test figures. Australia won by an innings to square the series. Against England in 1970–71 he was the main Australian runmaker with 627 runs (52.25). In the First Test Stackpole should have been run out for 18 as Geoff Boycott threw down the wicket at the bowler's end, but the batsman was given the benefit of the doubt by Lou Rowan. The Australian papers carried photographs the next day showing that he was clearly out and labelled the decision "one of the worst in cricket history". It probably cost England victory as Stackpole took advantage of his escape to pile up 207 – his highest Test score – in Australia's 433. Faced with an impossible 469 runs to win in the Sixth Test Stackpole made a powerful 136 with 16 boundaries to save the game, adding 202 for the second wicket with Ian Chappell (104) as Australia made 328–3 on the last day. In the Seventh and last Test Australia needed 223 to win and save the Ashes. Stackpole hit 2 sixes and 6 fours in his 67, but received little support from the rest of the team and they were all out for 160. On the Ashes tour of England in 1972 he was Ian Chappell's vice-captain and made 485 runs (52.88), topping the Australian batting averages for the second series in a row and being named a Wisden Cricketer of the Year in 1973.

References

External links
 

1940 births
Living people
Australia One Day International cricketers
Australia Test cricketers
Australian cricket commentators
Victoria cricketers
Wisden Cricketers of the Year
Australian cricketers
People from Collingwood, Victoria
Cricketers from Melbourne